Alexa is a genus of flowering plants. Members of this genus accumulate iminosugars in their leaves.

References

Angylocalyceae
Fabaceae genera